The Walter Camp “Alumni of the Year” award is bestowed by the Walter Camp Football Foundation on a worthy individual who has distinguished himself in the pursuit of excellence as an athlete, in his personal career and in doing good works for others.  He must be an individual who has exhibited dedication and good moral conduct in achieving success. He must be a compassionate and unselfish person who contributes his time and assistance in helping to encourage and comfort fellow human beings less talented and less fortunate than himself.  He must be an individual who takes pride in having been a Walter Camp All-American.

Honorees
2013 - Ken Huff, North Carolina
2012 - Derrick Brooks, Florida State
2011 - Chris Spielman, Ohio State
2010 - Tedy Bruschi, Arizona
2009 - David Fulcher, Arizona State
2008 - Tim Brown, Notre Dame
2007 - Ray Guy, Southern Mississippi
2006 - Mike Rozier, Nebraska
2005 - Cornelius Bennett, Alabama 
2004 - George Rogers, South Carolina 
2003 - Mark May, Pittsburgh 
2002 - Dave Casper, Notre Dame 
2001 - Herschel Walker, Georgia 
2000 - Don McPherson, Syracuse 
1999 - Bo Jackson, Auburn 
1998 - Tony Dorsett, Pittsburgh 
1997 - Jim Plunkett, Stanford 
1996 - Lee Roy Selmon, Oklahoma 
1995 - Jim Covert, Pittsburgh 
1994 - Ed Marinaro, Cornell 
1993 - Archie Griffin, Ohio State 
1992 - Kellen Winslow, Missouri 
1991 - Steve Owens, Oklahoma 
1990 - Tom Jackson, Louisville 
1989 - Dr. Tommy Casanova, Louisiana State 
1988 - Alan Page, Notre Dame 
1987 - Mike Reid, Penn State 
1986 - Joe Greene, North Texas

See also
Walter Camp Man of the Year
Walter Camp Distinguished American Award
Amos Alonzo Stagg Award
National Football Foundation Distinguished American Award
National Football Foundation Gold Medal Winners
Theodore Roosevelt Award (NCAA)
Walter Payton Man of the Year Award
"Whizzer" White NFL Man of the Year Award

References

College football lifetime achievement awards
Awards established in 1986